Northern district is a district of Plovdiv, southern Bulgaria. It is often referred by the citizens as Karshiaka meaning "the other bank" in Turkish. It has 53,870 inhabitants. The district is located on the northern bank of the Maritsa river.

Structure 

The district includes the neighbourhoods of Jurii Gagarin, Filipovo, Zaharna Fabrikia,  and Gaganitsa. The 8,000-seat stadium of FC Maritsa Plovdiv is located in the western part of the district. 

The transport infrastructure includes Filipovo railway station and bus station "Sever" (meaning north in Bulgarian). 

The Plovdiv International Fair is situated in the eastern parts of the district. There are three large hotels: Novotel Plovdiv, Maritsa Hotel and Sankt Peterburg Hotel (which is currently the tallest building in Plovdiv).

Administration 

The mayor of the Northern district is Dr Ina Filipova from the coalition GERB-IMRO – Bulgarian National Movement.

Education

Universities
Plovdiv University - the main building with most faculties.

Schools
The schools include:
Plovdiv English Language School
Ivan Vazov Language Schools
Peyo Yavorov High School

References 
 Northern district (in Bulgarian)

Neighbourhoods in Plovdiv